Grace Lau Mo-sheung (born 19 October 1991) is a Hong Kong karateka. She won bronze in the women’s kata event at the 2020 Summer Olympics in Tokyo, Japan, becoming the first Hong Kong athlete to win an Olympic medal in karate. She is also a bronze medallist in the women's individual kata event at the World Karate Championships, the Asian Games and the World Beach Games. She is also a five-time medalist at the Asian Karate Championships.

Career

She won the silver medal in the women's kata event at the 2015 Asian Karate Championships held in Yokohama, Japan. In 2018, she won one of the bronze medals in the women's kata event at the 2018 Asian Games held in Jakarta, Indonesia. Later that year, she also won one of the bronze medals in the women's kata event at the 2018 World Karate Championships held in Madrid, Spain.

She won a medal at the Asian Karate Championships in 2015, 2018 and 2019. At the 2019 Asian Karate Championships held in Tashkent, Uzbekistan, she won the silver medal in the women's individual kata event.

In 2020, she qualified to represent Hong Kong at the 2020 Summer Olympics in Tokyo, Japan. She defeated Dilara Bozan of Turkey with a score of 26.94 and won the bronze medal in the women’s kata event. She was also the flag bearer for Hong Kong during the closing ceremony. A few months after the Olympics, she won one of the bronze medals in the women's individual kata event at the 2021 World Karate Championships held in Dubai, United Arab Emirates. A month later, she won one of the bronze medals in her event at the Asian Karate Championships held in Almaty, Kazakhstan.

She won the bronze medal in the women's kata event at the 2022 World Games held in Birmingham, United States.

Achievements

Filmography

Movie

Drama

References

External links
 
 

1991 births
Living people
Place of birth missing (living people)
Hong Kong female karateka
Karateka at the 2018 Asian Games
Asian Games medalists in karate
Asian Games bronze medalists for Hong Kong
Medalists at the 2018 Asian Games
Karateka at the 2020 Summer Olympics
Medalists at the 2020 Summer Olympics
Olympic medalists in karate
Olympic bronze medalists for Hong Kong
Competitors at the 2022 World Games
World Games bronze medalists
World Games medalists in karate
21st-century Hong Kong women